Conservative People's Party may refer to:
Conservative People's Party (Argentina)
Conservative People's Party (Bohemia), a political party in the 1900s and 1910s
Conservative People's Party (Denmark)
Conservative People's Party of Estonia
Conservative People's Party (Germany), a short-lived party of the late 1920s and early 1930s
Conservative People's Party (Poland)
Swiss Conservative People's Party, predecessor of the Christian Democratic People's Party of Switzerland

See also
Conservative Party (disambiguation)
People's Party (disambiguation)